Litomiris debilis is a species of bug from the family Miridae. It is yellowish-orange, with black antennae.

References

Stenodemini